John Dalrymple may refer to:

Nobles
John Dalrymple, 1st Earl of Stair (1648–1707), Scottish noble
John Dalrymple, 2nd Earl of Stair (1673–1747), Scottish soldier and diplomat
John Dalrymple, 5th Earl of Stair (1720–1789)
John Dalrymple, 6th Earl of Stair (1749–1821)
John Dalrymple, 7th Earl of Stair (1784–1840)
John Dalrymple, 8th Earl of Stair (1771–1853), British soldier and politician
John Dalrymple, 10th Earl of Stair (1819–1903), Scottish peer and politician
John Dalrymple, 11th Earl of Stair (1848–1914), British army officer and nobleman
John Dalrymple, 12th Earl of Stair (1879–1961), Scottish soldier and Conservative politician
John Dalrymple, 13th Earl of Stair (1906–1996), British peer
John Dalrymple, 14th Earl of Stair (born 1961), British politician
Sir John Dalrymple, 4th Baronet (1726–1810), historian

Others

John Dalrymple (died 1742) (1699–1742), Member of Parliament for Wigtown Burghs, 1728–1734
 John Hamilton (1715–1796), Scottish politician born John Dalrymple, MP for Wigtown Burghs and Wigtownshire
John Dalrymple (political writer) (1734–1779), Scottish writer
John Dalrymple (Royal Navy officer) (died 1798)
John Dalrymple (physician) (1803–1852), English ophthalmologist
John Hamilton Elphinstone Dalrymple (1819–1888), British Army general
Jack Dalrymple (born 1948), current Governor of North Dakota
Jack Dalrymple (musician), American musician
John Dalrymple (cricketer) (born 1957), English cricketer